Ace of Spades is the fourth studio album by British rock band Motörhead, released in October 1980 via Bronze Records. It is the band's most commercially successful album, peaking at number four on the UK Albums Chart and reaching gold status in the UK by March 1981. It was preceded by the release of the title track as a single on 27 October, which peaked in the UK Singles Chart at No. 15 in early November.

It was the band's debut release in the United States, with Mercury Records handling distribution in North America. In 2020, the album was ranked at 408 on Rolling Stone's 500 Greatest Albums of All Time list.

Background
By 1979, Motörhead had released two extremely successful classic albums, Overkill and Bomber, and had gained a loyal fan following by constant touring and television appearances. Their ferocious, loud proto-thrash playing style appealed equally to punks and heavy metal fans, but in 1979 Sounds writer Geoff Barton coined the term "New Wave of British Heavy Metal" (NWOBHM) to classify a slew of newer bands such as Iron Maiden, Def Leppard, and Saxon. Motörhead – a band that resented being labeled anything other than rock 'n' roll – was placed in this new genre, which would go on to influence the emerging thrash metal movement that would include bands like Metallica and Megadeth. In the 2011 book Overkill: The Untold Story of Motörhead, Joel McIver quotes vocalist and bassist Lemmy: 

Regardless, the association with NWOBHM would be another positive element in the increasing momentum that would lead to the band's most successful commercial period at the beginning of the new decade. In fact, United Artists decided to finally release the band's "lost" first album at this time under the title On Parole, which had originally been recorded in 1976 but shelved because it was deemed commercially unviable. Next, the Big Beat label, which had taken over Chiswick's catalogue, released Beer Drinkers and Hell Raisers, packaging four extra tracks that the band had laid down for their debut album. Further evidence of Motörhead's nascent mainstream success was the release of the EP The Golden Years in May 1980 on Bronze Records, which became their highest charting release to date, peaking at No. 8.

Recording
Motörhead recorded Ace of Spades with Vic Maile at Jackson's Studios in Rickmansworth in August and September 1980. Maile, who had worked with the likes of Jimi Hendrix, Led Zeppelin, and the Who, had crossed paths with Lemmy when he was a member of Hawkwind. The bassist recalls in his 2002 memoir White Line Fever:

As Steffan Chirazi observes in the liner notes to the 1996 reissue of Ace of Spades: 

Maille, who was affectionately nicknamed "Turtle" by the band (for his resemblance to the reptile), was critical in giving Motörhead a sleeker sound on record without sacrificing its raw power. Diminutive and soft-spoken, Maille was well equipped to deal with the trio, who were notorious for in-fighting and general unmanageability. In the documentary The Guts and the Glory, drummer Phil "Philthy Animal" Taylor remembers:

In 2015, Clarke recalled to John Robinson of Uncut:

Whereas the band had previously had an input at the mixing stage, Maile took sole responsibility here, Clarke explaining that the result was "you can finally hear everything that's going on." Of the performances, Lemmy stated "Vic got me singing instead of just shouting all the time", while Taylor added "and he got me playing more solid."

Composition 
The album includes some of the band's most popular songs, including "The Chase Is Better Than the Catch", "(We Are) the Road Crew", and the hit single "Ace of Spades", which rose to No. 15 on the UK Singles Chart. In his autobiography, White Line Fever, Lemmy speaks at length about the tune:
In 2011, Lemmy admitted to James McNair of Mojo:

The song "(We Are) the Road Crew" was written as a tribute to the band's roadies. In the 2004 Classic Albums documentary on the making of the album, guitarist "Fast" Eddie Clarke declares:

In the same film, Lemmy, who worked as a roadie for Jimi Hendrix and the Nice, recalls that he wrote the song "in ten minutes" and that when roadie Ian "Eagle" Dobbie heard the song "he had a tear in his eye". Many of the songs, such as "Love Me Like a Reptile". "The Chase Is Better Than the Catch", and "Jailbait". blatantly reference sex, which drew the ire of some critics and feminists. Clarke explained to Classic Albums in 2005:

The Mercury Records vinyl release has an entirely different track order, which many fans feel is a better delivery of the album as a whole.

Release
Motörhead appeared on Top of the Pops twice in October to promote the single "Ace of Spades", and were guests on the ITV children's morning show Tiswas on 8 November. The band undertook a UK tour from 22 October through to 2 December under the banner Ace Up Your Sleeve, with support from Girlschool and Vardis. After the Belfast show on 2 December, hijinks resulted in Taylor breaking his neck forcing him to wear a neck-brace and curtailing any further band activity. The other members of the band took the opportunity to collaborate with Girlschool for the St. Valentine's Day Massacre EP.

Artwork
Like the song "Shoot You in the Back", the Ace of Spades artwork employs a classic wild west motif. Originally the idea for the album cover was to have it in a sepia tone and have gunfighters at a card table, but the band decided against it. They decided instead to have themselves in the desert dressed as cowboys. The 'Arizona desert-style' pictures used on the album sleeve and tour programme were taken during a photo session at a sandpit in Barnet. Each of their cowboy outfits were based on different type of Western protagonist. Eddie was based on Clint Eastwood's character, The Man with No Name from the Dollars Trilogy. Phil's costume was based on Marlon Brando's character in One-Eyed Jacks. Lemmy's costume was claimed by Phil to be inspired from Bret Maverick from the TV show Maverick. Contrary to popular belief, the sky was not real and was airbrushed in due to it being very cloudy that day.

Critical reception

The album has been described as "one of the best metal albums by any band, ever" and a significantly influential "hard rock classic".
AllMusic calls it "rock-solid, boasting several superlative standouts" and insists it "rightly deserves its legacy as a classic".
Sid Smith of BBC Music enthused in 2007: 

Despite the band always referring to their music as rock 'n' roll, the album, and particularly its title track, have been considered amongst the most influential in the development of thrash metal. The title track is, for many, the definitive Motörhead anthem. 

The album is listed in the book 1001 Albums You Must Hear Before You Die. In 2020, it was ranked at 408 on Rolling Stones 500 Greatest Albums of All Time list.

Classic Albums documentary
On 28 March 2005, the documentary about the album (a part of the Classic Albums series) was released on DVD by Eagle Vision. The in-depth look at the making of the album includes interviews with and performances by Lemmy, Phil Taylor and Eddie Clarke.

Track listing

International version

Original US version

Sanctuary Records 2005 2-CD deluxe edition

Disc one includes the original album without bonus tracks.

 Dirty Love is an official release by Eddie Clarke on Receiver Records Ltd. in 1989, which had various outtakes from the Ace of Spades sessions on it. It includes the tracks "Hump on your Back", "Waltz of the Vampire", "Bastard" and "Godzilla Akimbo", which are all demos that never got to be mastered at the time, but were done so in poor quality later for this release. These four tracks are also credited to Clarke solely on this release, even though it is the three members of Motörhead playing on the tracks.
 The 1996 reissue is missing Girlschool covering "Bomber", and the 2005 reissue is missing the tracks completely, from the St. Valentines Day Massacre EP the bands did in 1981 for their shared label Bronze Records.

BMG 40th anniversary deluxe edition
On 30th October 2020, BMG released a deluxe box set of the album, which includes seven 12" LPs, one 10" EP and a DVD. Beside the normal album, which is presented in a special 40th Anniversary Master, the box set included the album Riders Wearing Black, which is a live recording made on 23 December 1981, at the Whitla Hall in Belfast. Another live recording, made on 5 March 1981, at Parc Expo in Orleans, is called Dead Man's Hand. The rarity collection is called The Good, The Bad & The Ugly. The set comes with a 10" EP, which includes seven instrumental demos, titles A Fistful Of Instrumentals. Pre-orders from the official shop of the band were able to receive a Dutch replica of the Ace Of Spades single, with the instrumental of the song on the b-side.

Personnel 
Per the album's liner notes.
 Lemmy – vocals, bass, backing vocals on "Emergency"
 "Fast" Eddie Clarke – lead guitar, lead vocals on "Emergency"
 Phil "Philthy Animal" Taylor – drums except on "Please Don't Touch" & "Emergency"
 Kim McAuliffe – rhythm guitar on "Please Don't Touch"
 Kelly Johnson – co-lead vocals & co-lead guitar on "Please Don't Touch"
 Enid Williams – bass on "Please Don't Touch" (Note: Enid and Lemmy play bass on the track, making it a six piece for this song)
 Denise Dufort – drums on "Please Don't Touch" & "Emergency" (Note: Dufort plays all the drums on the EP because Taylor had a broken neck at the time)

Production
Vic "Chairman" Maile – producer, engineer & mixing
Giovanni Scatola – mastering (2005 remaster)
Martin Poole – design
Alan Ballard – photography
Curt Evans – 2005 cover design
Joe Petagno – Snaggletooth

2005 deluxe edition remaster
Steve Hammonds – release coordination
Jon Richards – release coordination
Malcolm Dome – sleeve notes
Mick Stevenson – project consultant, photos and archive memorabilia

Charts

Certifications

Release history

The labels on the 1986 GWR re-issue had the GWR logo and "A" on one side, and side two on the other. The tracks were also erroneously listed in the order of the US release.

References

Motörhead albums
1980 albums
Albums produced by Vic Maile
Bronze Records albums
Mercury Records albums
Speed metal albums